Luis Armando González Bejarano (born November 16, 1968) is a Mexican football manager and former player.

References

External links
 

1968 births
Living people
Mexican footballers
Association football forwards
Deportivo Toluca F.C. players
Querétaro F.C. footballers
Mexican football managers
Footballers from Aguascalientes
Liga MX players
Ascenso MX players